14 Trianguli (14 Tri), also known as HD 15656, is a spectroscopic binary located in the northern constellation Triangulum. It has an apparent magnitude of 5.14, making it faintly visible to the naked eye in ideal conditions. At its current distance, 14 Tri's brightness is diminished by 0.21 magnitude due to interstellar dust. It has an absolute magnitude of −0.46.

The visible component is an evolved red giant with a stellar classification of K5 III. It has 1.85 times the mass of the Sun, but it has expanded to 40.5 times its girth. This is a single-lined spectroscopic binary that completes an eccentric orbit within 17 years. The secondary star has not been detected visually or in the spectrum and is expected to be a low-mass red dwarf or white dwarf. 14 Tri may be part of the Wolf 630 moving group.

References

Further reading 
 

K-type giants
Triangulum (constellation)
Trianguli, 14
015656
011784
0736
BD+35 00497